28th parallel may refer to:

28th parallel north, a circle of latitude in the Northern Hemisphere
28th parallel south, a circle of latitude in the Southern Hemisphere